The South African national cricket team toured Zimbabwe in September 2001 and played a two-match Test series against the Zimbabwean national cricket team. South Africa won the Test series 1–0. South Africa were captained by Shaun Pollock and Zimbabwe by Heath Streak. In addition, the teams played a three-match series of Limited Overs Internationals (LOI) which South Africa won 3–0.

Squads

Test Series

1st Test

2nd Test

ODI series

1st ODI

2nd ODI

3rd ODI

References

External links

2001 in South African cricket
2001 in Zimbabwean cricket
South African cricket tours of Zimbabwe
International cricket competitions in 2001–02
Zimbabwean cricket seasons from 2000–01